Tonbridge railway station is on the South Eastern Main Line in England, serving the town of Tonbridge, Kent. Trains calling at the station are operated by Southeastern and Southern.

Tonbridge forms a junction between the South Eastern Main Line, the Hastings Line and the Redhill–Tonbridge line. There are four platforms. Platform 4 is a terminating platform.

History 

The South Eastern Railway (SER) first reached Tonbridge (then known as Tunbridge) in May 1842. The site of the original station was on the east side of the road bridge over the railway, opposite its current location to the west of the bridge. The building of the station obliterated the last remains of  Tonbridge Priory. At the time, the line ran to London Bridge via Redhill and Croydon, using the Brighton Main Line. It served as a temporary terminus until December 1842, when the line reached Ashford.  A couple of years later the through line to Dover opened. A small engine shed was built; the date of opening is uncertain but it is presumed to date from the opening of the line. On 20 September 1845, a branch to  opened. The station was later renamed Tunbridge Junction. Over the next seven years the branch was extended to Hastings. Access to the line to Hastings was via an indirect link which required a reverse. This arrangement lasted until 1857 when a steeply climbing direct route was opened.

The cut-off joined the main line at Tonbridge. This prompted a rebuild of the station, and in 1864 it was rebuilt on its current site with four platforms. The original station was demolished in 1865 after closure, but the entrance gateways are still in situ. The down side entrance is in Vale Road opposite Sainsbury's, and the up side entrance is in Priory Road, forming the entrance to the car park.

The cut-off opened in 1868. Soon afterwards, a larger engine shed was built, but still on the opposite side of the bridge to the main part of the station. In May 1893, the station changed its name to Tonbridge Junction, following the change in the town's name to avoid confusion with the larger Tunbridge Wells. At that time, there were two through platforms, two through roads, and two bay platforms at the west end of the station. The indirect line to Tunbridge Wells remained in use until about 1913, after which it was closed and the track dismantled. By November 1919, the up platform station roof bore the name TONBRIDGE in white letters. This feature was a navigational aid for aircraft.

Under the Southern Railway, the station was renamed Tonbridge in July 1929. It was rebuilt in 1935, with the bay on the south side of the station converted to a through platform. This entailed the construction of a new section of bridge under the road outside the station.

By May 1958, the brick station building fronting the main road had been rebuilt with a tiled facade. The Sevenoaks to Dover line via Tonbridge was electrified in 1961 when the Southern Region improved train frequencies and faster journey times were introduced under British Railways as part of the Kent Coast Electrification. The line south to Tunbridge Wells and Hastings was electrified in 1986 by British Rail, and finally the line to Redhill was electrified in 1993 also by British Rail as part of the Eurostar/Channel Tunnel route improvement works.

Eurostar trains ran through Tonbridge station until the first section of the High Speed line was built through Kent, to cut down journey times from London to the Channel Tunnel.  The transfer happened on 28 September 2003. The station was refurbished in 2011–12.

In 2015, the station gained a resident cat, Saffie. The 8-year-old animal needed a new home when her owners moved house. Staff at the station adopted her. Saffie died in March 2018.

Platforms
Platforms 1 and 2 are an island platform.
Platform 1 for Southern trains to/from Redhill (which terminate here from the west) and to/from Maidstone West and Strood (which terminate here from the east).
Platform 2 for trains from Dover, Ramsgate and Hastings to London via Sevenoaks.
Platform 3 is an island platform, and Platform 4 is a west-facing bay.
Platform 3 for all trains to Dover and Ramsgate via Ashford International and to Hastings via Tunbridge Wells.
Platform 4 for trains to/from London (which terminate here from the west)

Services 

The typical off-peak service in trains per hour is:
 4 tph to London Charing Cross (semi-fast)
 2 tph to  via  (1 semi-fast, 1 stopping)
 1 tph to 
 1 tph to  via 
 1 tph to 

During the peak hours, the station is served by an additional half-hourly between London Charing Cross and Tunbridge Wells. There are also additional services to and from London Cannon Street and the service to Dover Priory is extended to and from Ramsgate via .

The station is also served by a limited number of morning, mid afternoon and late evening services to  via .

Tonbridge yard and sidings

There are extensive yards and storage sidings (tracks) on both the east and west sides of the station.

To the east of the station are Tonbridge East Sidings, four sidings and a two-track shed used by Network Rail for maintenance equipment storage and materials delivery. These occupy part of the site of the former engine shed. 

Further down the line towards Paddock Wood, there is the now disused Tonbridge Postal Siding. This was opened in 1995 with a new down "slow" line to handle mail and parcels traffic for the nearby Royal Mail sorting office. Its use was short-lived owing to the loss of most mail traffic to road haulage.

To the west, between the Redhill line and the West Yard, the four electrified 'Jubilee' sidings are used to stable trains. The adjacent West Yard, operated by GB Railfreight, has sixteen non-electrified tracks and is now mainly used for stabling engineers' trains. The West Yard was built in 1941 as part of the improvements needed for freight train traffic during World War Two, and is spanned by a long footbridge carrying a public footpath between Douglas Road and Clare Avenue.

Tonbridge Power (signal) Box stands at the eastern entrance to the Jubilee sidings and West Yard. Built in 1962, it is still in limited operational use.

Adjacent to the main London line there are two short electrified sidings (Tonbridge Down Main sidings).

Accidents
On 1 January 1846, a bridge over the River Medway collapsed in a flood. A train driver was killed when he tried to jump clear of the train.
On 30 September 1866, four carriages which had been slipped from a Dover bound train to be worked to  ran through the station and collided with some empty carriages in a siding. Eleven people were injured.
On 23 October 1899, a passenger train from Redhill collided with the buffer stop in the bay platform. Sixteen people were injured.
On 23 January 1903, a passenger  train from London collided with the buffer stop in the bay platform. Five people were injured.
On 5 March 1909, a train travelling towards Redhill overran a signal and collided with the boat train from Charing Cross to Dover. Two railway staff were killed and eleven passengers injured. A third train was prevented from crashing into the wreckage by the prompt actions of two travelling ticket inspectors. As a consequence of the accident, the Royal Train carrying King Edward VII and Queen Alexandra was diverted at Chislehurst Junction to take a different route to Dover.
On 23 August 2020, Class 377 electric multiple unit 377317 was derailed at the exit of the Jubilee Sidings.

References

Sources

External links

 
 Kent Rail - Tonbridge
 Tonbridge Line Commuters - Tonbridge

Tonbridge
Railway stations in Kent
DfT Category B stations
Train driver depots in England
Former South Eastern Railway (UK) stations
Railway stations in Great Britain opened in 1842
Railway stations in Great Britain closed in 1864
Railway stations in Great Britain opened in 1864
Railway stations served by Govia Thameslink Railway
Railway stations served by Southeastern
Rail accidents caused by a driver's error
Railway sidings
1842 establishments in England